M. F. Heller House, also known as the Arrowsmith House and Old Methodist Church Parsonage, is a historic home located at Kingstree, Williamsburg County, South Carolina.  It was built about 1845 and enlarged about 1895 to a substantial two-story Late Victorian residence. It is a two-story, lateral-gabled residence, sheathed in weatherboard and set on a stuccoed brick pier foundation. It is the only antebellum residence built within the original limits of Kingstree.

It was listed on the National Register of Historic Places in 1994.

References

Houses on the National Register of Historic Places in South Carolina
Georgian architecture in South Carolina
Victorian architecture in South Carolina
Houses completed in 1847
Houses in Williamsburg County, South Carolina
National Register of Historic Places in Williamsburg County, South Carolina
1847 establishments in South Carolina